Amt Lebus is an Amt ("collective municipality") in the district of Märkisch-Oderland, in Brandenburg, Germany. Its seat is in Lebus.

The Amt Lebus consists of the following municipalities:
Lebus
Podelzig
Reitwein
Treplin
Zeschdorf

Demography

References

Lebus
Märkisch-Oderland